Mount Auburn is a village in Christian County, Illinois, United States. The population was 452 at the 2020 census.

Geography
Mount Auburn is located at  (39.7659, -89.2611).

Demographics

As of the 2020 census there were 452 people, 273 households, and 172 families residing in the village. The racial makeup of the village was 93.14% White, 0.22% African American, 0.66% Asian, 1.33% from other races, and 4.65% from two or more races. Hispanic or Latino of any race were 0.66% of the population.

There were 273 households, out of which 53.11% had children under the age of 18 living with them, 58.61% were married couples living together, 1.83% had a female householder with no husband present, and 37.00% were non-families. 27.11% of all households were made up of individuals, and 12.45% had someone living alone who was 65 years of age or older. The average household size was 2.91 and the average family size was 2.36.

The village's age distribution consisted of 22.8% under the age of 18, 5.9% from 18 to 24, 39.2% from 25 to 44, 23.3% from 45 to 64, and 8.9% who were 65 years of age or older. The median age was 38.7 years. For every 100 females, there were 119.0 males. For every 100 females age 18 and over, there were 95.7 males.

The median income for a household in the village was $49,904, and the median income for a family was $67,717. Males had a median income of $31,250 versus $29,479 for females. The per capita income for the village was $22,930. About 4.1% of families and 9.0% of the population were below the poverty line, including none of those under age 18 and 7.0% of those age 65 or over.

History

Mount Auburn was founded on July 11, 1839.  It was seriously considered as possibility for the state capital at the time the center of government was moved from Vandalia to Springfield.

The following information was found in an article by Jane Long in The Breeze, a Taylorville newspaper. >

MT. AUBURN — In the early beginnings of this country, as pioneers trekked west for opportunity and prosperity, the old Cumberland Road, which began at Cumberland, Maryland, was left by many at Terre Haute, Indiana. These people then followed what was known as the Terre Haute-Decatur-Springfield Trail, which passed south of Decatur, south of the Sangamon River, through what became Mt. Auburn and on to Springfield.
The Village of Mt. Auburn was founded in 1839, located on an elevation about fifty feet above the surrounding country.

In the "Springfield Journal" of September 18, 1839, the new village was described as follows: "This elevation is most beautiful and commands an extensive view, overlooking the country for some ten or fifteen miles, and embracing within the limits of vision the towns of Allenton, Stonington, and but for an intervening skirt of time Edinburg, and part of Sangamon and Logan counties. The improvements in Mt. Auburn are at this time limited. It was surveyed and platted by J.R. Skinner, on July 11, 1839. Not a blow had been struck for its improvement until this date. Now it has one large store, one large barn designed for the use of a tavern, and one dwelling house. Materials are now collected for the erection of a brick tavern house, which it is intended will be second to none in the state. Within a circuit of eight miles around Mt. Auburn 140 families are located. The population recently arrived is mostly from the New England states. The old residents are generally from Kentucky, Tennessee and the south.

"This tract of country, for beauty, fertility and health, we do not believe is exceeded in any location in the state. The land is gently and agreeable undulating, such as any eastern man would select for a farm, every foot of which seems capable of cultivation."

Established on May 8 of that year, the Mt. Auburn Post Office is reputed to be the oldest now in existence in Christian County. For years, rumor had it that Mt. Auburn was even considered as a site for the state capital, along with Springfield, Quincy and East St. Louis, when the capital was moved from Vandalia.

The first steam mill in the county was done by John B. Augur in Mt. Auburn in the summer of 1840. It consisted of a saw mill and one pair of burrs for grinding corn. Augur settled in Mt. Auburn as an agent of an Eastern colony company that owned a tract of land containing about 40,000 acres in Dane County (later called Christian County), 15,000 of which are heavily timbered. He also was the proprietor of the first store in the village, which he opened in 1839, and was the first postmaster.

Early Mt. Auburn commerce included two stores, blacksmith shop, tavern, and other commerce around a square at the top of the hill. The Terre Haute-to-Quincy stage route brought travelers to the village.

The First United Methodist Church of Mt. Auburn had its beginning in 1843 with the organization of a church class by six people at a meeting held in the home of Mr. and Mrs. John Benson. The class continued until 1851, when a Methodist circuit was formed that consisted of Mt. Auburn, Eagle School and Washington School in Christian County and Nebraska School and Blue Mound in Macon County. Construction of a church located where the present building stands was completed in 1856 at a cost of about $3000. Mrs. Gregg, a cousin of Harry Bottrell's mother, gave the ground where the church stands and also the Mt. Auburn Cemetery site. The church trustees voted on May 16, 1868, to erect a parsonage. The first church stood on almost the same site as the present one, with two doors, one for the men and women entering in the other. The present church was erected on the site of the old church in 1926, and dedication took place on March 20–27, 1927.

In 1866 the congregation of the Church of Christ which had been holding services in the Brush Schoolhouse, some three miles northeast of Mt. Auburn, moved their church into the village and built a chapel. It was later remodeled in 1898. In 1875 the congregation broke up, and for a period of twelve years the house was opened only for funerals. A series of meetings were held in 1887 and revived the congregation. The current house of worship for the Mt. Auburn Church of Christ was erected in 1918.

A cholera epidemic in 1854 created many deaths and caused those who did survive to leave the hill.

Originally incorporated in 1862, the charter was later relinquished and then rechartered in 1892.

When the Indianapolis-Decatur and Western Railroad extended its line from Decatur to Springfield in 1901, village commerce moved to the south side of the hill, causing a building boom for both businesses and residential property. Mt. Auburn was reportedly the most important station between the two cities. Other stations along the line in Christian County were Osbernville, Bolivia and Roby.

The Mt. Auburn Independent Telephone System, a locally owned telephone system, was established in early 1905 by local businessmen F. B. Mulberry and Carl Miller. Mt. Auburn had a great building boom in the spring of 1905, both in the business and residential districts. Every business house but one decided to move from the top of the hill to the south end of town. Their buildings were either moved or new ones were built.

Commerce in 1906 included the railroad station, livery stable, hardware and implement stores, lumber yard, barber shop, saloons, elevator, hotel, harness shops, opera house, bank, restaurants and drug stores, to name a few.

In 1911 Oliver Hardy, Edward L. Smith, S. R. Shepherd and F. B. Mulberry formed a partnership and took over the business of the First National Bank that was first opened in 1901. This bank has continued to provide services for residents of Mt. Auburn and the surrounding community throughout the years, one of the oldest banks in the county.

In 1918, the Wurl Electric Light Company brought electricity to those who could afford it.

Four daily trains provided connections east and west with the rest of the world.

A serious fire in 1922 destroyed many businesses along the west side of Broad Street, but shortly new construction replaced those that were lost.

The construction of the munition plant near Illiopolis during World War II was a boom to the local economy. Even though many young men and women from the area served their country in the war effort, many others served at home by working at the plant.

In February 1919, a petition was initiated to establish a community high school, which would take in five school districts in Mosquito Township and four school districts in Mt. Auburn Township. The petition was filed and the election was to be held on March 8, 1919. The election was canceled by the State Superintendent due to a Supreme Court ruling invalidating the law under which the petition was filed.

In July 1919, a second petition was initiated. This election was held on July 19, 1919, with voters approving the establishment of the Mt. Auburn Community High School by a vote of 290 to 139.

On Monday, September 22, 1919, the Mt. Auburn Community High School began classes with twenty-two pupils and two instructors. Classes were held in the lower level of the Masonic Lodge.

After one unsuccessful referendum, the voters approved a proposition on October 10, 1925, to purchase a site and construct a high school. The Mt. Auburn High School was built in 1926 on what was then known as the D.C. Armstrong site, twelve lots one block east of the village park. The total cost of the original building was reportedly $44,184, with the site costing $1800.

On Monday, September 6, 1926, the new Mt. Auburn High School opened for classes with 69 students enrolled. The first graduating class from the new building was in 1927.

On March 1, 1949, an architect was employed to design an addition to the building which would house the library, agriculture class room and shop area. In 1951 the addition was constructed as a cost of $44,000. On November 16, 1952, this new addition was dedicated.

The present elementary school was built in 1952, with a cafeteria and gymnasium, as well as a large playground and an agricultural experiment acreage. Mt. Auburn had become a unit school in 1949.

On November 7, 1989, voters approved the idea to deactivate the high school and tuition the students to Taylorville High School. With the 69th graduation on May 25, 1990, the Mt. Auburn Community High School classes came to an end. Records indicate that 1135 students graduated from Mt. Auburn.

In 1992 the school district annexed to the Taylorville School District. Though elementary children from grades kindergarten through fifth grade attend school in Mt. Auburn, junior- and senior-high students attend school in Taylorville. On July 4, 1992, the interior of the high school building was burned and on Monday, July 6, 1992, the building was demolished.

In August 1994, a twelve-foot-square, patio-style, brick memorial

was dedicated in the village park during the Mt. Auburn Farmers Picnic to honor the high school. The actual stone nameplate, salvaged from the high school, was placed on top of a black granite slab which included the etched image of the high school and its proud Eagle mascot.

With agriculture and ag-related industries the biggest of the community, today approximately twenty businesses are located in Mt. Auburn, though many of these are small businesses that are run from the business owners' homes. Businesses include a gas station, greenhouse and floral shop, auto repair, fertilizer company, elevator, tavern, bank, electrical contractor, building contractor and plumbing contractor. Though some of these businesses are relatively new, the First National Bank was begun in 1911. Hardy Fertilizer Co. celebrates its fortieth anniversary in the year 2000.

Though shopping malls, discount groceries and interstate highways have ended some of the commercial trade in Mt. Auburn, construction of such new enterprises as the new three-hole golf course and new fire station, both completed in 2000, new gas station built three years ago and the recently acquired village hall, along with about thirty-five building permits issued for new homes or major remodeling projects, indicate the growth in the village of approximately 550 people and the commitment of these residents to their home on the hill.

Picnic
An annual event is the Mount Auburn Picnic.  Started in 1887 in Morganville by 13 men including Hi Montgomery and T. A. Montgomery,  the picnic was moved to Mt Auburn in 1919.  Currently the event is held in the Mount Auburn city park.

References

Villages in Christian County, Illinois
Villages in Illinois
Populated places established in 1839